David VandeLinde is an American electrical engineering graduate from Carnegie Tech in 1964 and was the Vice-Chancellor of the University of Warwick from 2001 to 2006.

David VandeLinde was raised in St. Albans, WV.  He graduated from St. Albans High School in 1960.  He played football and was an offensive end.

Professor VandeLinde came to Warwick in 2001 from the University of Bath, where he had been Vice-Chancellor for nine years. He was awarded an Honorary Degree (Doctor of Laws) by the University of Bath in 2001.

VandeLinde saw Warwick through five years of fast growth, but not without controversy. As well as being closely associated with the 'corporate' ethos of Warwick, he became prominent supporter of higher tuition fees for students. He was also a firm supporter of the University's attempts to build a campus in Singapore, which did not ultimately come to fruition.

Before coming to the United Kingdom, VandeLinde was dean of the engineering faculty at Johns Hopkins University in Baltimore, Maryland.

References

American electrical engineers
Carnegie Mellon University College of Engineering alumni
Johns Hopkins University faculty
American expatriates in the United Kingdom
Vice-Chancellors of the University of Bath
Vice-Chancellors of the University of Warwick
Year of birth missing (living people)
Living people